The following is a list of episodes for the British reality television show Made in Chelsea that first aired on E4 on 9 May 2011 and has so far aired 18 main series and a further 6 spin-off series. Series 19 began broadcasting on 23 March 2020.

, 231 episodes of Made in Chelsea have aired. 13 specials have also aired, including eight End of Season Party episodes, the 100th episode special, "The Aftermath" special, "Big Christmas Quiz" special, "Christmas Ding Dong" special and the "Christmas Party" special.

Series overview

Series 1 (2011)

Series 2 (2011)

Series 3 (2012)

Series 4 (2012)

Series 5 (2013)

Series 6 (2013)

Series 7 (2014)

NYC (2014)

Series 8 (2014)

Series 9 (2015)

LA (2015)

Series 10 (2015)

Series 11 (2016)

South of France (2016)

Series 12 (2016)

Series 13 (2017)

Ibiza (2017)

Series 14 (2017)

Series 15 (2018)

Croatia (2018)

Series 16 (2018)

Series 17 (2019)

Series 18 (2019)

Buenos Aires (2019)

Series 19 (2020)

Series 20 (2020)

Series 21 (2021)

Series 22 (2021)

Series 23 (2022)

References 

Made in Chelsea